The Jubilee Cup is a rugby trophy. It is the premier club competition trophy of the Wellington Rugby Football Union, and the current holders are Tawa, following their 36-7 defeat of Marist St Pats in the 2021 final.

Origins and history
The Jubilee Cup was first presented for competition in 1929 by the WRFU, honouring the union's 50th Jubilee. The first winners were the Victoria University club, defending the title they won in 1928.

Petone are the club with the most Jubilee Cup successes, winning the trophy 22 times, including five consecutive wins from 1967-1971. Two of these titles were shared, with St Pat's Old Boys in 1949 and Wellington in 1982.

The next most successful club is Marist St Pats (14 titles since formation in 1971) who can also claim another 6 titles from its predecessor clubs Marist Brothers Old Boys (3 outright, 2 shared) and St Pat's Old Boys (1 shared). Other clubs with five or more titles are Athletic (7 outright, 1 shared), Victoria University (7 outright, 1 shared), Wellington (five outright, two shared), and Poneke (five outright plus another two in amalgamation with Oriental during World War II).

By contrast Oriental-Rongotai's 2011 victory was their first outright Wellington title since 1910. Old Boys-University's 2015 success was their first since their 1991 merger, and first for the merger identity since University's last win in 1966.

Recent history
Between 1993 and 1996 the trophy was rebranded as the Lion Brown Trophy for sponsorship purposes. This also coincided with the introduction of the current finals format. Since then the trophy has been won by Marist St Pats (7), Petone (3), Norths (3) Poneke (2), Hutt Old Boys-Marist (2), Tawa (2), Western Suburbs (1), Oriental-Rongotai (1), and Old Boys-University (1). Norths and Marist St Pats also shared the 2008 title after the final finished 10-all and the competition rules did not allow for extra-time to be played, a situation which has since been rectified.

Competition format
Currently the Jubilee Cup round is the second round of the Wellington competition. The fourteen teams in the Premier competition firstly play the round-robin Swindale Shield competition over 13 rounds, with the top 8 teams moving onto the Jubilee Cup round (the bottom 6 teams are joined by the top 2 eligible teams from the Premier Reserve competition to contest the Hardham Cup). 
The Jubilee Cup is also contested in a round-robin format, this time over seven rounds, with the top 4 teams progressing to the semi-finals where the top team (since 2009 awarded the Andy Leslie Trophy) hosts the fourth-placed qualifier and second hosts third. The final is then held at usually a neutral venue. Athletic Park hosted the final up to the 1999 decider, since then Westpac Stadium has been the main venue, though recent finals have been held at the Petone Recreation Ground, Hutt Recreation Ground, and Porirua Park.

Wellington Club Championship Titles Won (Jubilee Cup from 1929 & pre-Jubilee Cup)

Number of titles by club 

Statistic valid as of August 2022.

Statistic valid as of August 2022.

References 
2. http://www.clubrugby.co.nz/wellington/story.php?id=2276
New Zealand rugby union competitions